The Topolița (also: Toplița) is a right tributary of the river Moldova in Romania. It discharges into the Moldova in Spiești.

References

Rivers of Romania
Rivers of Neamț County